The Sawtooth Mountains Wilderness is a federal wilderness area of  located in the Sawtooth Mountains in eastern San Diego County, California.

This land was added to the National Wilderness Preservation System when the US Congress passed the California Desert Protection Act of 1994 (Public Law 103-433).  The Bureau of Land Management is the agency in charge of the Sawtooth Mountains Wilderness.

Description
Wilderness topography includes ridges, valleys, and canyons that support a wide array of plant and animal life.  Wildlife include raptors, such as the golden eagle and prairie falcon.  The spotted bat, San Diego horned lizard, and the willow flycatcher are also found here.

Vegetation consists of Sonoran Desert plants, including ocotillo, cholla cactus, and creosote bush.

Although State Route 2 winds along the northern side of the wilderness, there is no legal access due to private lands along the boundary. The only public access is from the Pepperwood Height Trail, at the end of the McCain Valley.

See also
Flora of the Sonoran Deserts
Fauna of the Sonoran Deserts

References

External links
Bureau of Land Management, Sawtooth Mountains Wilderness page.

Wilderness areas of California
Protected areas of the Colorado Desert
Protected areas of San Diego County, California
IUCN Category Ib
Bureau of Land Management areas in California
Protected areas established in 1994
1994 establishments in California